CMCA may refer to:

Groups, organizations, companies
 Center for Maine Contemporary Art
 Chinese Methodist Church in Australia
 CMCA 550 AM (radio station), San Antonio de las Vegas, Cuba
 Cheyenne Mountain Charter Academy, former name of The Vanguard School (Colorado)
 Confederacion Masonica Centroamericana, see List of Masonic Grand Lodges

Other uses
 Cruise Missile Carrier Aircraft, a proposed USAF military variant of the Boeing 747
 Cmca, a crystalline configuration; see orthorhombic crystal system
 Cmca, a space group in mathematics; see List of space groups
 Certified Manager of Community Associations, a certification for community association manager

See also